Entelea arborescens or whau is a species of malvaceous tree endemic to New Zealand. E. arborescens is the only species in the genus Entelea. A shrub or small tree to 6 m with large lime-like leaves giving a tropical appearance, whau grows in low forest along the coast of the North Island and the northern tip of the South Island. The dry fruit capsules are very distinctly brown and covered with spines. The common name whau is a Māori word that appears to derive from the common Polynesian word for hibiscus, particularly Hibiscus tiliaceus, which it superficially resembles. Alternate names include 'New Zealand mulberry', 'corkwood' and 'evergreen lime'.

Description
Within the Malvaceae, Entelea is placed within tribe Sparrmannieae and subfamily Grewioideae, a position confirmed by ndhF DNA sequence data. As is the case with most malvaceous plants, E. arborescens has alternate, stipulate foliage. The bright green, obliquely cordate leaves are large (10 to 20 cm long), and have from 5 to 7 nerves and long petioles. The flowers are borne profusely between early spring and mid-summer. They have 4 or 5 sepals and 4 or 5 petals. They are 2 cm in diameter, scented, white, with a central tuft of densely-packed yellow stamens. The brown seed capsules, which are 1½ cm long, bear 2½ cm long rigid bristles.

Whau has very lightweight wood, rivalling balsa (Ochroma pyramidale) for lightness, and less dense than cork. The wood was used by Māori for the floats of fishing nets and for similar items. The pale brown wood forms several bands of unlignified pith-like parenchyma per year. This is a characteristic shared with related plants including Sparrmannia, and causes there to be no distinct growth rings in the wood.

Distribution
The species is extremely light-demanding and is unable to live under an unbroken canopy. It cannot tolerate even moderate cold, strong wind, or a very dry or ill-drained soil. Its occurrence is sporadic even in undisturbed coastal forest. In lowland rain-forest whau is rare, found only beside streams in valleys near the coast where open ground and sufficient warmth and light are found.

Although whau occurs here and there in Nelson and Marlborough in the South Island, occurrence is local south of Lat. 38°. The plant has never been found more than 8 km. from the sea (Waitākere Stream, near Auckland), nor higher than 350 m. Extreme minimum temperatures for localities where Entelea really thrives are always, so far as the records show, well above 0 °C.

Ecology
In its natural habitat the tree depends mainly for success upon its prodigious seed production, the remarkably long life of the seed, and, after germination, rapid growth. In forest, whau is essentially a transient, opportunist species. The characteristics which cause it to be effective in such a role include: its ability to quickly occupy ground where light has been temporarily let into the forest; its tremendous rate of growth; its ability to rapidly produce fruit; its enormous seed production, especially as it is about to die; and the fact that its seeds are capable of germinating as soon as the capsules open. 
Whau seeds can be stimulated into growth by fire after lying on the surface of the ground for many years. Having germinated, whau establishes itself with striking rapidity. In a study on Taranga (Hen Island), in favourable conditions whau was often the first new plant to appear, followed by Urtica ferox (tree nettle), Macropiper excelsum (kawakawa), Coprosma macrocarpa (coastal karamu) and Coprosma lucida (shiny karamu); forest-dominating trees were slower to come in – Corynocarpus (karaka) most quickly, followed by Beilschmiedia tawa (tawa).

Cultivation 
Preferring a rich moist loam, whau can be grown outdoors in sun or light shade in mild climates, or in a conservatory or glasshouse in cold climates. It is intolerant of drought and is able to withstand barely 3 °C of frost. Propagation is from seed, which is available commercially. It also strikes readily from hardwood cuttings about 20–30 cm long with leaves and twigs removed. Thrust deep into gritty damp soil in black PB bags and covered with a wet sack or newspaper for a week to keep moist; new leaves will appear after about three weeks. Best left a few months until strong re-growth is obvious before transplanting.

References 

 L. H. Millener, 'A Study of Entelea arborescens R. Br. (Whau): Part I. Ecology'. Transactions and Proceedings of the Royal Society of New Zealand, Volume 76, 1946–47, pp. 267–288.

Grewioideae
Monotypic Malvales genera
Trees of New Zealand
Endemic flora of New Zealand